Paisley Rekdal is an American poet who is currently serving as Poet Laureate of Utah. She is the author of a book of essays entitled The Night My Mother Met Bruce Lee: Observations on Not Fitting In, the memoir Intimate, as well as five books of poetry. For her work, she has received numerous fellowships, grants, and awards, including a Guggenheim Fellowship, the Amy Lowell Poetry Traveling Fellowship, a Fulbright Fellowship, a Civitella Ranieri Residency, a National Endowment for the Arts Fellowship, Pushcart Prizes in both 2009 and 2013, Narrative's Poetry Prize, the AWP Creative Nonfiction Prize, and several other awards from the state arts council. She has been recognized for her poems and essays in The New York Times Magazine, American Poetry Review, The Kenyon Review, The New Republic, Tin House, the Best American Poetry series, and on National Public Radio, among others. She was also a recipient of a 2019 Academy of American Poets' Poets Laureate Fellowship.

Early life and education
She grew up in Seattle, Washington, the daughter of a Chinese-American mother and a Norwegian father and received a Bachelor of Arts degree from the University of Washington, as well as a Master of Arts degree from the University of Toronto for Medieval Studies and a Master of Fine Arts degree from the University of Michigan.

Career
Rekdal is a professor at the University of Utah in Salt Lake City, and at Goddard College's low-residency Master of Fine Arts in Creative Writing program in Port Townsend, Washington. She is also credited with having created the community web project Mapping Salt Lake City.

Her work appeared in Black Warrior Review, Denver Quarterly, Michigan Quarterly Review, Narrative Magazine, Nerve, New England Review, The New York Times Magazine, NPR, Ploughshares, Prairie Schooner, Quarterly West, The Virginia Quarterly Review, and Blackbird.

She was appointed Poet Laureate of Utah in May 2017.

In 2018, Rekdal was awarded the  Narrative Prize for a trilogy of poems, “Quiver,” “Telling the Wasps,” and “The Olive Tree at Vouves,” which combine "Keatsian lyricism with a mortal questioning of the nature of memory in the modern age."

Works

Six Girls Without Pants, Eastern Washington University Press, 2002,  

Nightingale. Copper Canyon Press. 7 May 2019. 

Non-fiction
 
Intimate: An American Family Photo Album, Tupelo Press, 2012,

References

External links
Official website
Official Twitter Account
University of Utah faculty profile of Paisley Rekdal
"Of Perspective and Perception": An Interview with Paisley Rekdal (Interview Series, The Poetry and Literature Center at the Library of Congress)
Animal Eye by Paisley Rekdal – Coal Hill Review

Living people
University of Washington alumni
University of Toronto alumni
University of Michigan alumni
University of Utah faculty
Writers from Seattle
Year of birth missing (living people)
Goddard College faculty